Long Is the Road may refer to:

 Long Is the Road (film), a 1948 German film
 "Long Is the Road (Américain)", a 1984 song by Jean-Jacques Goldman

See also
Long Road (disambiguation)